West Suffolk College is a Further Education college in Bury St Edmunds, Suffolk. The college delivers a range of courses, including vocational and technical courses, apprenticeships, and an array of higher-apprenticeships and bachelor's degree courses accredited by the University of East Anglia. Over 12,000 students are enrolled at West Suffolk College.

Campuses
The main campus site is the Gateway Building situated on Out Risbygate in Bury St Edmunds. The Built Environment Campus or Milburn Centre is situated on Anglian Lane and the STEM Innovation Campus and University Studies Centre is situated on Western Way. Both are a short walk from the sixth form campus.

The college also has training centres in Haverhill, Thetford, Sudbury and Ipswich, with courses also being taught in towns and villages across Suffolk including Clare, Pakenham, Thurston and Stowmarket.

Suffolk Academies Trust 
The college is a sponsor of the Suffolk Academies Trust, a collaboration with One Sixth Form College in Ipswich and Abbeygate Sixth Form College in Bury St Edmunds. In 2016, Suffolk Academies Trust was given permission by the Department for Education to build a new sixth form, Abbeygate, in Bury St Edmunds. The sixth form will aim to cater for up to 1,700 pupils, offering more than 30 A-level courses to 16-19 year olds.

Eastern Colleges Group 
West Suffolk College, Abbeygate Sixth Form in Bury St Edmunds and One Sixth Form College in Ipswich are collectively known as the Eastern Colleges Group. The Group is a collective of post-16 education providers, sharing the same strategic aims to provide outstanding vocational and academic excellence to over 15,000 students across the region. The shared mission of the Group is to be a catalyst of positive social change and prosperity for the community, leaving no-one behind, with a vision to put students at the heart of everything they do. The 'three pillars' of the shared strategic aims are to support students in making excellent connections with employers, to help students achieve qualifications to the best of their ability and to cultivate character strengths such as resilience and optimism.

University Studies at West Suffolk College 
University Studies at West Suffolk College was a founding member of the University of Suffolk, providing a range of apprenticeships and undergraduate degree courses. However, there was an end to the partnership between the two institutions planned from the academic year 2021–2022.

A wide range of Bachelor's degrees are now delivered in partnership with the University of East Anglia as well as a range of Higher National Qualifications.

History
In 1951, the Bury St Edmunds Technical Institute began offering Engineering, Building and vocational evening classes in the grounds of the Silver Jubilee School. In 1958, it decided to construct a new purpose built college on its own ground, at the Gibraltar Barracks site, where the West Suffolk College is today. It was officially opened on 29 May 1961.

In the 1970s and 1980s, the college expanded; from 1970 to 1977, the Engineering, Construction and Motor Vehicle training centres were built. In 1983, Australia House, a dedicated beauty, hair and hospitality school was opened. A year later, a purpose built facility for students with learning difficulties and disabilities was built. The expansion continued into the 1990s; with Gibraltar House opening in 1999.

In 2006, the college was awarded Grade 1: Outstanding by Ofsted and in 2011, Dr Ann Williams, the then Principal, was appointed an OBE for services to Further Education in the Queen's Birthday Honours list. She was replaced by Dr Nikos Savvas in 2013. In 2014, a new building, The Gateway, now the face of the college, was opened. The following year the college received confirmation of a £7m government grant to help pay for an £8m energy, engineering and manufacturing teaching centre. In September 2015, the college began Animal Care and Management courses at the Newmarket Academy. In 2016, the college was ranked in the top five per cent in the country for its achievement rates in Level 3 Vocational Diplomas, the best in the Eastern Region, and the second best GCSE English resit results in the country.

Former Chairs of Governors at the college have gone on to be awarded an MBE, including Elizabeth Milburn and Richard Carter. The current Chair of Governors at the college and Suffolk Academies Trust, Elton D'Souza is a National Leader of Governance.

The college offers a range of Apprenticeships and in 2016, it enrolled over 1,000 people onto its apprenticeships, with an achievement rate eight per cent higher than the national average at 78%.

Following an inspection under new grading criteria, the college was graded as 'Good' by Ofsted.

The college was named in July 2019 as a computing hub for the National Centre for Computing Education.

In 2020, the college became the first provider to have an Apprenticeship accredited by The Royal Society of Chemistry

In 2021, the college joined the National College for Nuclear (NCfN) as an Accredited Provider. It has also been acknowledged as the first college in the country to facilitate the teaching of black history all year round and has won prestigious industry accolades for outstanding and innovative careers leadership and practice.

Principal and CEO 
Dr Nikos Savvas has a doctorate in High Energy Particle Physics from Manchester University and has held senior roles in the further education sector for a number of years. He is a board member for various organisations including the New Anglia Local Enterprise Partnership's All Energy Industry Council, the New Anglia Local Enterprise Partnership's Skills Advisory Panel for Norfolk and Suffolk and the Special Educational Needs and Disabilities Trust (SENDAT). He took up the role of Principal and CEO at West Suffolk College in September 2013.

Alumni 
 Nathaniel Warner - Helicopter Pilot
 Nick Pope - Footballer
 Toby Stuart - Hospitality Consultant to Albert Roux
 David Starie - Former Professional Boxer
 Ben Jordan - Model
 Adam King - Composer

References

Further education colleges in Suffolk
Bury St Edmunds
Educational institutions established in 1951
1951 establishments in England